Conasprella allamandi is a species of sea snail, a marine gastropod mollusk in the family Conidae, the cone snails, cone shells or cones.

Distribution
This species occurs in the Caribbean Sea off Honduras.

References

 Petuch E. (2013) Biogeography and biodiversity of western Atlantic mollusks. CRC Press. 252 pp.
  Puillandre N., Duda T.F., Meyer C., Olivera B.M. & Bouchet P. (2015). One, four or 100 genera? A new classification of the cone snails. Journal of Molluscan Studies. 81: 1-23

External links
 World Register of Marine Species
 Gastropods.com: Jaspidiconus allamandi

allamandi
Gastropods described in 2013